Phoberus arcuatus is a species of hide beetle in the subfamily Troginae.

References

arcuatus
Beetles described in 1953